Van Dyke and Company is an American comedy and variety show television series hosted by Dick Van Dyke on NBC in 1976. Andy Kaufman made his prime time debut on the show and became a series regular. The executive producer of the show, Byron Paul, was the manager and producer to Dick Van Dyke. The pilot episode was directed by Art Fisher and aired as a CBS TV special on October 30, 1975. The series aired from September 20, 1976, to December 30, 1976, before it was cancelled due to low ratings. Despite its cancellation, the show won an Emmy Award for Outstanding Variety Series at the 29th Primetime Emmy Awards in 1977. Van Dyke also won Favorite Male Performer in a New TV Program at the 3rd People's Choice Awards.

Episodes

References

External links

1976 American television series debuts
1976 American television series endings
1970s American satirical television series
1970s American variety television series
1970s American sketch comedy television series
English-language television shows
American parody television series
NBC original programming
Dick Van Dyke
Primetime Emmy Award for Outstanding Variety Series winners